Strzyżów  is a town in Strzyżów County, Subcarpathian Voivodeship, Poland, along the Wisłok river valley. According to statistics from June 30, 2010 from GUS (the Central Statistical Office in Poland), there are 8,782 inhabitants.

History

The history of Strzyżów dates back to the 9th century, to the times of the Wiślanie tribe (Vistulans) when a legendary pagan Vistulan prince is said to have built a watchtower by Stobnica and Wisłok river called "Strzeżno", for the defence of eastern borders of his land. In 1279, in Buda (Hungary), the Pope's legate named Bishop Philip confirmed the abbot's right to take a special tax (a tithe) from Czudec and Strzyżów.

Strzyżów obtained city rights between 1373 and 1397. The town was surrounded by a soil defence embankment (Zawale Street still exists and it relates to that embankment). These were the times of town splendour and its development, craft, farming and trade contracts with other towns in what is now Poland, Hungary and Slovakia. In 1373, Strzyżów came into the hands of a knight, Wojtko, and later Pakosz and his sons Jan and Mikołaj. With time the town changed its owners. On 15 August 1769 the Bar Confederates made an oath in front of the painting of Immaculate Mary in Strzyżów, in the presence of Casimir Pulaski and Franciszek Trzecielski. After this event, that image appeared on the Confederates’ Banner. In 1796 the foundation of secular school strengthened town development as well as royal permission for organisation of four fairs a year from 1684. Following the partitions of Poland in the late 18th century, the town became part of Austrian Galicia.

Throughout its history Strzyżów suffered from as many as nine fires, the last one in 1895 caused the populace to build buildings solely from brick. By 1880 Strzyżów was inhabited mostly by Poles, but there were also significant minorities such as the Jews and the Germans. In 1918, the town returned to Poland (Second Polish Republic). The 1960s and 1970s gave beginning to industrialisation; many factories, companies, schools and cultural centres were founded in the town's vicinity.

Schools 
 Adam Mickiewicz Secondary School
 Technical Schools
 Municipal Schools
 White Eagle Primary School No. 1
 Maria Konopnicka Primary School No. 2
 Public Middle School No. 1
 Zygmunt Mycielski National School of Music - 1st degree
 Career Development Center

Notable residents
Mieczysław G. Bekker (1905–1989), engineer and scientist

International relations

Twin towns — Sister cities
Strzyżów is twinned with:

See also
Lendians
Great Moravia
Ostsiedlung
Kingdom of Galicia and Lodomeria
Ruthenian Voivodeship
Lwów Voivodeship
Pogórzanie

References
Notes

Cities and towns in Podkarpackie Voivodeship
Strzyżów County
Lesser Poland
Kingdom of Galicia and Lodomeria
Lwów Voivodeship